Esei Ha'angana (born 21 April 1999) is an Australian professional rugby union player for the Melbourne Rebels in Super Rugby. His position is lock.

Career
Ha'angana made his debut for the Rebels against the Lions as a late bench replacement for Colby Fainga'a before replacing Amanaki Mafi in the 5th minute in a defeat for the Rebels.

Super Rugby statistics

References

External links
 Esei Ha'angana - Rugby.com.au Profile

1999 births
Australian rugby union players
Rugby union locks
Melbourne Rebels players
Living people
Melbourne Rising players
Australian expatriate rugby union players
Expatriate rugby union players in Japan
Saitama Wild Knights players
Rugby union players from Sydney